"The Kids Are Sick Again" is a song by Newcastle-upon-Tyne band Maxïmo Park. It is  the first single released from their third studio album, Quicken the Heart. The single was released on 4 May 2009. The song entered the UK singles chart at #50.

Frontman Paul Smith explained to the NME that this song is about the effect of advertisements on the youth today. He said: "I guess I thought society as a whole is bombarded by advertisements and to me that's why the kids are sick again. It's a funny sounding phrase but it's a serious song - so it's a nice blend of being amused, but [also] I hope people sit up and take notice of it."
Drummer Tom English added: "They [the youth of today] can't express themselves anymore and this is for them."

Smith told Drowned in Sound: "The first line ('The comforting ache of the summer holiday') indicates that queasy feeling of adolescent isolation that I remember experiencing. The song's ultimate feeling is of escape and I think the music builds to that release after a pulsing, atmospheric beginning."

Track listings

The track listing was revealed via e-mail to fans signed up to the bands mailing list and also made available on their online store.

CD
 "The Kids Are Sick Again" – 3:05
 "Russian Dolls" – 2:58

7" 1 (Yellow vinyl)
 "The Kids Are Sick Again" – 3:05
 "Tales of the Semi-Detached" – 1:58

7" 2 (Orange vinyl)
 "The Kids Are Sick Again" (acoustic) – 2:53
 "History Books" – 2:45

Digital Download
 "The Kids Are Sick Again" (Demo Version)

iTunes Download EP
 "The Kids Are Sick Again" – 3:05
 "Russian Dolls" – 2:58
 "Tales of the Semi-Detached" – 1:58
 "History Books" – 2:45

References

External links
 https://www.nme.com/news/maximo-park/43712
 http://www.culturedeluxe.com/news_item.asp?id=5854

2009 singles
Maxïmo Park songs
Songs written by Paul Smith (rock vocalist)
Songs written by Duncan Lloyd
Song recordings produced by Nick Launay
2009 songs
Songs written by Lukas Wooller
Warp (record label) singles